What a Country! is an American sitcom starring Garrett M. Brown and Yakov Smirnoff that aired in first-run syndication from September 27, 1986, to May 23, 1987. The series is based on the British sitcom Mind Your Language and was intended as a showcase for Ukrainian-American comedian Yakov Smirnoff, whose catchphrase provided the show's title.

Synopsis
What a Country! is set in a class of recent immigrants to the United States who are trying to pass the citizenship test. Their teacher, Taylor Brown (played by Garrett M. Brown), is a part-time substitute teacher looking for a high school soccer coaching job, while the students are:

 Nikolai (a Russian taxi driver),
 Laszlo (a retired Hungarian doctor),
 Ali (a Pakistani),
 Robert (the son of a deposed African king),
 Maria (a housekeeper working for a rich Beverly Hills family),
 Victor (a Hispanic in love with Maria), and
 Yung Hi (a shy Chinese woman).

Gail Strickland initially played the character of Principal Joan Courtney, though she was replaced by Don Knotts during the series' run.

Cast
 Garrett M. Brown as Taylor Brown
 Yakov Smirnoff as Nikolai Rostopovich
 George Murdock as Laszlo Gabo
 Vijay Amritraj as Ali Nadim
 Harry Waters, Jr. as Robert Muboto
 Ada Maris as Maria Conchita Lopez
 Julian Reyes as Victor Ortega
 Leila Hee Olsen as Yung Hi
 Gail Strickland as Principal Joan Courtney (episodes 1–10)
 Don Knotts as Principal F.J. "Bud" McPherson (episodes 11–26)

Episodes

References

External links

1986 American television series debuts
1987 American television series endings
1980s American sitcoms
American television series based on British television series
English-language television shows
First-run syndicated television programs in the United States
Television shows set in Los Angeles
Television series by Tribune Entertainment
Television series by CBS Studios